is a mountain located on Kuba-jima of Senkaku Islands in Ishigaki, Okinawa, Japan. It is the highest point of the island.

Mountains of Okinawa Prefecture
Senkaku Islands